Asinnajaq (born 1991),  Isabella Rose Rowan-Weetaluktuk, is a  Canadian Inuk visual artist, writer, filmmaker, and curator, from Inukjuak, Quebec. She is most noted for her 2017 film Three Thousand, which received a Canadian Screen Award nomination for Best Short Documentary Film at the 6th Canadian Screen Awards.

She has also been active as a curator of Inuit art and video projects, including the Canadian pavilion at the 58th Venice Biennale and the Inuit Art Centre at the Winnipeg Art Gallery.

Biography 
Asinnajaq was born in Inukjuak, Nunavik, and is currently based out of Montreal, Quebec. The name “Asinnajaq” is a family name that means “nomadic outlier” in the local Inuktitut dialect. Her mother, Carol Rowan, is a university professor, while her father, Jobie Weetaluktuk, is a filmmaker. She studied film at the Nova Scotia College of Art and Design at the university in Halifax. She assisted her father on Timuti (2012), a film he made in Inukjuak, home of their extended family. She is the niece of Daniel Weetaluktuk, the first Inuk archeologist in Canada, who is the subject of her upcoming short film Daniel.

Work 
Through her artistic work, Asinnajaq draws her inspiration from the notion of respect for human rights, and the desire to explore her Inuit heritage. Her practice is grounded in research and collaboration. Her short film Upinnaqusittik, made in 2016, premiered at iNuit Blanche, the first ever circumpolar arts festival in St. John's. While working for the National Film Board, drawing on their archives, she directed her film Three Thousand in 2017. Alongside her artistic work, she has led Inuit culture workshops at the McCord Museum with her mother. Asinnajaq was also part of the curatorial team at the Canadian Pavilion at the 2019 Venice Biennale. In 2020 Asinnajaq received a Sobey Art Award.

Awards and nominations

References

21st-century Canadian women artists
Canadian women film directors
Canadian art curators
Canadian Inuit women
Inuit filmmakers
Artists from Quebec
Film directors from Quebec
Living people
Inuit from Quebec
1991 births
Canadian women curators
Canadian contemporary artists